The Battle of Riccardina or Battle of Molinella, fought on July 25, 1467, in Molinella, was one of the most important battles of the 15th century in Italy.

Combatants 
 On the one side were 14,000 infantry and cavalry led by Bartolomeo Colleoni in theory fighting for Venice (but Colleoni had his personal agenda), in coalition with Borso d'Este, Marquis of Ferrara (represented by his half-brother Ercole I d'Este) and the Lords of Pesaro, Forlì, and some renegade families of Florence.
 On the other side was an army of 13,000 soldiers in the service of Florence, allied with Galeazzo Maria Sforza (ruler of the Duchy of Milan), King Ferdinand II of Aragon and Giovanni II Bentivoglio (ruler of Bologna). The army was led by Federico da Montefeltro.

The battle 
The battle was fought along the Idice river, between the villages of Riccardina (near Budrio) and Molinella.
Historians disagree on who won the battle. The only certainty is that Bartolomeo Colleoni had to abandon his plans to conquer Milan. There were between 600 and 700 casualties. Notable was the large number of horses killed (almost 1,000).

The battle is historically important because, for the first time in Italy, artillery and firearms were intensively used.

A large fresco in the Castle of Malpaga, probably by Girolamo Romani, depicts the battle.
In 1468 peace was concluded under the initiative of Pope Paul II.

Molinella
Molinella
Molinella
Molinella
1467 in Europe
15th century in the Republic of Florence
15th century in the Republic of Venice
Molinella
Emilia (region of Italy)